The International Railway Journal (IRJ) is a monthly international trade magazine published by Simmons-Boardman Publishing in Falmouth, England.

History
Founded by Robert Lewis and Railway Age editor Luther Miller as the world's first globally distributed magazine for the railway industry, the first edition of IRJ was published as a pilot in October 1960. Monthly production commenced in January 1961.

Content
The magazine covers a range of rail-related content, covering sectors including passenger, freight, high-speed, metro and light rail. Regular subject matters include financial news, fleet orders, infrastructure, new technologies and government policy.

Circulation and Distribution
IRJ publishes regular content on its website, and also publishes a monthly print edition, distributed through controlled circulation. IRJ's print edition had a circulation of 10,234 copies in 2020, according to the Audit Bureau of Circulations (UK).

References

Magazines established in 1960
Mass media in Cornwall
Monthly magazines published in the United Kingdom
Professional and trade magazines
Rail transport magazines published in the United Kingdom
1960 establishments in England